The 10th Regiment Indiana Cavalry, also designated the 125th Indiana Regiment, was a Cavalry Regiment raised in southern Indiana to fight in the American Civil War.

History

The 10th Regiment Indiana Cavalry was organized at Columbus and Vincennes, Indiana, in the winter of 1863 through the spring of 1864. In command of the Regiment was Colonel Thomas N. Pace. The Regimental Companies were:

Organization
  Company A - Men primarily recruited from Posey and Vanderburgh counties
  Company B - Men primarily recruited from Gibson, Knox, Posey and Vanderburgh counties
  Company C - Men primarily recruited from Bartholomew, Jackson, Jennings and Warren counties
  Company D - Men primarily recruited from Switzerland County
  Company E - Men primarily recruited from Clark County
  Company F - Men primarily recruited from Daviess, Gibson, Knox, Pike, Vanderburgh and Warrick counties
  Company G - Men primarily recruited from Dubois, Gibson, Spencer, Vanderburgh and Warrick counties
  Company H - Men primarily recruited from Jefferson County
  Company I - Men primarily recruited from Monroe County
  Company K - Men primarily recruited from Bartholomew, Gibson, and Posey counties
  Company L - Men primarily recruited from Bartholomew, Jennings, and Lawrence counties
  Company M - Men primarily recruited from Dubois, Pike, Spencer, Vanderburgh and Warrick counties

Army Organization

Time Line
Once the Regiment was moved into Pulaski, Tennessee, the 10th Indiana Cavalry Regiment was broken up into detachments for a variety of missions.

Regiment lost during service 1 Officer and 20 Enlisted men killed and mortally wounded and 4 Officers and 157 Enlisted men by disease. Total 182.

See also
 List of Indiana Civil War regiments

References
 Dryer, Frederick Henry. A Compendium of the War of the Rebellion, Des Moines: Dyer Publishing Co. 1908.
 Report of the Adjutant General of the State of Indiana, Volume 3, by W.H.H. Terrell, Adjutant General, Indiana, 1866
 Report of the Adjutant General of the State of Indiana, Volume 7, by W.H.H. Terrell, Adjutant General, Indiana, 1867
 "The Union Army" by Federal Publishing Company, 1908 - Volume 3

External links
 125th Indiana Regiment / 10th Indiana Cavalry in the American Civil War
 The Civil War Archive:  Regimental Histories - 10th Regiment Cavalry (125th Regiment Volunteers)
 Family Search:  10th Regiment, Indiana Cavalry

10 cav
Military units and formations established in 1863
1863 establishments in Indiana
Military units and formations disestablished in 1865